In particle physics, the Dirac equation is a relativistic wave equation derived by British physicist Paul Dirac in 1928. In its free form, or including electromagnetic interactions, it describes all spin- massive particles, called "Dirac particles", such as electrons and quarks for which parity is a symmetry. It is consistent with both the principles of quantum mechanics and the theory of special relativity, and was the first theory to account fully for special relativity in the context of quantum mechanics. It was validated by accounting for the fine structure of the hydrogen spectrum in a completely rigorous way.

The equation also implied the existence of a new form of matter, antimatter, previously unsuspected and unobserved and which was experimentally confirmed several years later. It also provided a theoretical justification for the introduction of several component wave functions in Pauli's phenomenological theory of spin. The wave functions in the Dirac theory are vectors of four complex numbers (known as bispinors), two of which resemble the Pauli wavefunction in the non-relativistic limit, in contrast to the Schrödinger equation which described wave functions of only one complex value. Moreover, in the limit of zero mass, the Dirac equation reduces to the Weyl equation.

Although Dirac did not at first fully appreciate the importance of his results, the entailed explanation of spin as a consequence of the union of quantum mechanics and relativity—and the eventual discovery of the positron—represents one of the great triumphs of theoretical physics. This accomplishment has been described as fully on a par with the works of Newton, Maxwell, and Einstein before him. In the context of quantum field theory, the Dirac equation is reinterpreted to describe quantum fields corresponding to spin- particles.

The Dirac equation appears on the floor of Westminster Abbey on the plaque commemorating Paul Dirac's life, which was unveiled on 13 November 1995.

Mathematical formulation 

Its expression also contains gamma matrices and a parameter  interpreted as the mass, as well as other physical constants.

In terms of a field , the Dirac equation is then

and in natural units, with Feynman slash notation,

The gamma matrices are a set of four  complex matrices (elements of ) which satisfy the defining anti-commutation relations:

where  is the Minkowski metric element, and the indices  run over 0,1,2 and 3. These matrices can be realized explicitly under a choice of representation. Two common choices are the Dirac representation

The slash notation is a compact notation for

where  is a four-vector (often it is the four-vector differential operator ). The summation over the index  is implied.

Dirac adjoint and the adjoint equation 
The Dirac adjoint of the spinor field  is defined as

Using the property of gamma matrices (which follows straightforwardly from Hermicity properties of the ) that

one can derive the adjoint Dirac equation by taking the Hermitian conjugate of the Dirac equation and multiplying on the right by :

where the partial derivative acts from the right on : written in the usual way in terms of a left action of the derivative, we have

Klein–Gordon equation 
Applying  to the Dirac equation gives

That is, each component of the Dirac spinor field satisfies the Klein–Gordon equation.

Conserved current 
A conserved current of the theory is

Another approach to derive this expression is by variational methods, applying Noether's theorem for the global  symmetry to derive the conserved current

Solutions 

Since the Dirac operator acts on 4-tuples of square-integrable functions, its solutions should be members of the same Hilbert space. The fact that the energies of the solutions do not have a lower bound is unexpected.

Plane-wave solutions 
Plane-wave solutions are those arising from an ansatz

which models a particle with definite 4-momentum  where 

For this ansatz, the Dirac equation becomes an equation for :

After picking a representation for the gamma matrices , solving this is a matter of solving a system of linear equations. It is a representation-free property of gamma matrices that the solution space is two-dimensional (see here).

These plane-wave solutions provide a starting point for canonical quantization.

Lagrangian formulation 
Both the Dirac equation and the Adjoint Dirac equation can be obtained from (varying) the action with a specific Lagrangian density that is given by:

If one varies this with respect to  one gets the adjoint Dirac equation. Meanwhile, if one varies this with respect to  one gets the Dirac equation.

In natural units and with the slash notation, the action is then

Gauging this field theory by changing the symmetry to a local, spacetime point dependent one gives gauge symmetry (really, gauge redundancy). The resultant theory is quantum electrodynamics or QED. See below for a more detailed discussion.

Lorentz invariance 

The Dirac equation is invariant under Lorentz transformations, that is, under the action of the Lorentz group  or strictly , the component connected to the identity.

There are some subtleties in defining the corresponding , as well as a standard abuse of notation.

Most treatments occur at the Lie algebra level. For a more detailed treatment see here.

When both the  indices are raised or lowered, these are simply the 'standard basis' of antisymmetric matrices.

These satisfy the Lorentz algebra commutation relations

In the article on the Dirac algebra, it is also found that the spin generators 

satisfy the Lorentz algebra commutation relations. 

A Lorentz transformation  can be written as

The corresponding transformation on spin space is

This is an abuse of notation, but a standard one. In practice we implicitly pick one of these  and then  is well defined in terms of 

Under a Lorentz transformation, the Dirac equation

becomes

Associated to Lorentz invariance is a conserved Noether current, or rather a tensor of conserved Noether currents . Similarly, since the equation is invariant under translations, there is a tensor of conserved Noether currents , which can be identified as the stress-energy tensor of the theory. The Lorentz current  can be written in terms of the stress-energy tensor in addition to a tensor representing internal angular momentum.

Historical developments and further mathematical details 

The Dirac equation was also used (historically) to define a quantum-mechanical theory where  is instead interpreted as a wave-function.

The Dirac equation in the form originally proposed by Dirac is:

where  is the wave function for the electron of rest mass  with spacetime coordinates . The  are the components of the momentum, understood to be the momentum operator in the Schrödinger equation. These fundamental physical constants reflect special relativity and quantum mechanics, respectively.

Dirac's purpose in casting this equation was to explain the behavior of the relativistically moving electron, and so to allow the atom to be treated in a manner consistent with relativity. His rather modest hope was that the corrections introduced this way might have a bearing on the problem of atomic spectra.

Up until that time, attempts to make the old quantum theory of the atom compatible with the theory of relativity, which were based on discretizing the angular momentum stored in the electron's possibly non-circular orbit of the atomic nucleus, had failed – and the new quantum mechanics of Heisenberg, Pauli, Jordan, Schrödinger, and Dirac himself had not developed sufficiently to treat this problem. Although Dirac's original intentions were satisfied, his equation had far deeper implications for the structure of matter and introduced new mathematical classes of objects that are now essential elements of fundamental physics.

There are four components in  because the evaluation of it at any given point in configuration space is a bispinor. It is interpreted as a superposition of a spin-up electron, a spin-down electron, a spin-up positron, and a spin-down positron.

and they all mutually anticommute:

These matrices and the form of the wave function have a deep mathematical significance. The algebraic structure represented by the gamma matrices had been created some 50 years earlier by the English mathematician W. K. Clifford. In turn, Clifford's ideas had emerged from the mid-19th-century work of the German mathematician Hermann Grassmann in his Lineare Ausdehnungslehre (Theory of Linear Extensions). The latter had been regarded as almost incomprehensible by most of his contemporaries. The appearance of something so seemingly abstract, at such a late date, and in such a direct physical manner, is one of the most remarkable chapters in the history of physics.

The single symbolic equation thus unravels into four coupled linear first-order partial differential equations for the four quantities that make up the wave function. The equation can be written more explicitly in Planck units as:

which makes it clearer that it is a set of four partial differential equations with four unknown functions.

Making the Schrödinger equation relativistic 
The Dirac equation is superficially similar to the Schrödinger equation for a massive free particle:

The left side represents the square of the momentum operator divided by twice the mass, which is the non-relativistic kinetic energy. Because relativity treats space and time as a whole, a relativistic generalization of this equation requires that space and time derivatives must enter symmetrically as they do in the Maxwell equations that govern the behavior of light — the equations must be differentially of the same order in space and time. In relativity, the momentum and the energies are the space and time parts of a spacetime vector, the four-momentum, and they are related by the relativistically invariant relation

which says that the length of this four-vector is proportional to the rest mass . Substituting the operator equivalents of the energy and momentum from the Schrödinger theory produces the Klein–Gordon equation describing the propagation of waves, constructed from relativistically invariant objects,

with the wave function  being a relativistic scalar: a complex number which has the same numerical value in all frames of reference. Space and time derivatives both enter to second order. This has a telling consequence for the interpretation of the equation. Because the equation is second order in the time derivative, one must specify initial values both of the wave function itself and of its first time-derivative in order to solve definite problems. Since both may be specified more or less arbitrarily, the wave function cannot maintain its former role of determining the probability density of finding the electron in a given state of motion. In the Schrödinger theory, the probability density is given by the positive definite expression

and this density is convected according to the probability current vector

with the conservation of probability current and density following from the continuity equation:

The fact that the density is positive definite and convected according to this continuity equation implies that one may integrate the density over a certain domain and set the total to 1, and this condition will be maintained by the conservation law. A proper relativistic theory with a probability density current must also share this feature. To maintain the notion of a convected density, one must generalize the Schrödinger expression of the density and current so that space and time derivatives again enter symmetrically in relation to the scalar wave function. The Schrödinger expression can be kept for the current, but the probability density must be replaced by the symmetrically formed expression

which now becomes the 4th component of a spacetime vector, and the entire probability 4-current density has the relativistically covariant expression

The continuity equation is as before. Everything is compatible with relativity now, but the expression for the density is no longer positive definite; the initial values of both  and  may be freely chosen, and the density may thus become negative, something that is impossible for a legitimate probability density. Thus, one cannot get a simple generalization of the Schrödinger equation under the naive assumption that the wave function is a relativistic scalar, and the equation it satisfies, second order in time.

Although it is not a successful relativistic generalization of the Schrödinger equation, this equation is resurrected in the context of quantum field theory, where it is known as the Klein–Gordon equation, and describes a spinless particle field (e.g. pi meson or Higgs boson). Historically, Schrödinger himself arrived at this equation before the one that bears his name but soon discarded it. In the context of quantum field theory, the indefinite density is understood to correspond to the charge density, which can be positive or negative, and not the probability density.

Dirac's coup 
Dirac thus thought to try an equation that was first order in both space and time. One could, for example, formally (i.e. by abuse of notation) take the relativistic expression for the energy

replace  by its operator equivalent, expand the square root in an infinite series of derivative operators, set up an eigenvalue problem, then solve the equation formally by iterations. Most physicists had little faith in such a process, even if it were technically possible.

As the story goes, Dirac was staring into the fireplace at Cambridge, pondering this problem, when he hit upon the idea of taking the square root of the wave operator thus:

with

This immediately explained the appearance of two-component wave functions in Pauli's phenomenological theory of spin, something that up until then had been regarded as mysterious, even to Pauli himself. However, one needs at least  matrices to set up a system with the properties required — so the wave function had four components, not two, as in the Pauli theory, or one, as in the bare Schrödinger theory. The four-component wave function represents a new class of mathematical object in physical theories that makes its first appearance here.

Given the factorization in terms of these matrices, one can now write down immediately an equation

Applying again the matrix operator on both sides yields

Taking  shows that all the components of the wave function individually satisfy the relativistic energy–momentum relation. Thus the sought-for equation that is first-order in both space and time is

Setting

and because , the Dirac equation is produced as written above.

Covariant form and relativistic invariance 
To demonstrate the relativistic invariance of the equation, it is advantageous to cast it into a form in which the space and time derivatives appear on an equal footing. New matrices are introduced as follows:

and the equation takes the form (remembering the definition of the covariant components of the 4-gradient and especially that )

In practice one often writes the gamma matrices in terms of 2 × 2 sub-matrices taken from the Pauli matrices and the 2 × 2 identity matrix. Explicitly the standard representation is

The complete system is summarized using the Minkowski metric on spacetime in the form

where the bracket expression

denotes the anticommutator. These are the defining relations of a Clifford algebra over a pseudo-orthogonal 4-dimensional space with metric signature . The specific Clifford algebra employed in the Dirac equation is known today as the Dirac algebra. Although not recognized as such by Dirac at the time the equation was formulated, in hindsight the introduction of this geometric algebra represents an enormous stride forward in the development of quantum theory.

The Dirac equation may now be interpreted as an eigenvalue equation, where the rest mass is proportional to an eigenvalue of the 4-momentum operator, the proportionality constant being the speed of light:

Using  ( is pronounced "d-slash"), according to Feynman slash notation, the Dirac equation becomes:

In practice, physicists often use units of measure such that , known as natural units. The equation then takes the simple form

A fundamental theorem states that if two distinct sets of matrices are given that both satisfy the Clifford relations, then they are connected to each other by a similarity transformation:

If in addition the matrices are all unitary, as are the Dirac set, then  itself is unitary;

The transformation  is unique up to a multiplicative factor of absolute value 1. Let us now imagine a Lorentz transformation to have been performed on the space and time coordinates, and on the derivative operators, which form a covariant vector. For the operator  to remain invariant, the gammas must transform among themselves as a contravariant vector with respect to their spacetime index. These new gammas will themselves satisfy the Clifford relations, because of the orthogonality of the Lorentz transformation. By the fundamental theorem, one may replace the new set by the old set subject to a unitary transformation. In the new frame, remembering that the rest mass is a relativistic scalar, the Dirac equation will then take the form

If the transformed spinor is defined as

then the transformed Dirac equation is produced in a way that demonstrates manifest relativistic invariance:

Thus, settling on any unitary representation of the gammas is final, provided the spinor is transformed according to the unitary transformation that corresponds to the given Lorentz transformation.

The various representations of the Dirac matrices employed will bring into focus particular aspects of the physical content in the Dirac wave function. The representation shown here is known as the standard representation – in it, the wave function's upper two components go over into Pauli's 2 spinor wave function in the limit of low energies and small velocities in comparison to light.

The considerations above reveal the origin of the gammas in geometry, hearkening back to Grassmann's original motivation; they represent a fixed basis of unit vectors in spacetime. Similarly, products of the gammas such as  represent oriented surface elements, and so on. With this in mind, one can find the form of the unit volume element on spacetime in terms of the gammas as follows. By definition, it is

Since this is negative, that factor is imaginary. Thus

This matrix is given the special symbol , owing to its importance when one is considering improper transformations of space-time, that is, those that change the orientation of the basis vectors. In the standard representation, it is

This matrix will also be found to anticommute with the other four Dirac matrices:

It takes a leading role when questions of parity arise because the volume element as a directed magnitude changes sign under a space-time reflection. Taking the positive square root above thus amounts to choosing a handedness convention on spacetime.

Comparison with related theories

Pauli theory 

The necessity of introducing half-integer spin goes back experimentally to the results of the Stern–Gerlach experiment. A beam of atoms is run through a strong inhomogeneous magnetic field, which then splits into  parts depending on the intrinsic angular momentum of the atoms.

Here  and  represent the components of the electromagnetic four-potential in their standard SI units, and the three sigmas are the Pauli matrices. On squaring out the first term, a residual interaction with the magnetic field is found, along with the usual classical Hamiltonian of a charged particle interacting with an applied field in SI units:

This Hamiltonian is now a  matrix, so the Schrödinger equation based on it must use a two-component wave function. On introducing the external electromagnetic 4-vector potential into the Dirac equation in a similar way, known as minimal coupling, it takes the form:

What is more, the value of the gyromagnetic ratio of the electron, standing in front of Pauli's new term, is explained from first principles. This was a major achievement of the Dirac equation and gave physicists great faith in its overall correctness. There is more however. The Pauli theory may be seen as the low energy limit of the Dirac theory in the following manner. First the equation is written in the form of coupled equations for 2-spinors with the SI units restored:

so

Assuming the field is weak and the motion of the electron non-relativistic, the total energy of the electron is approximately equal to its rest energy, and the momentum going over to the classical value,

and so the second equation may be written

which is of order  – thus at typical energies and velocities, the bottom components of the Dirac spinor in the standard representation are much suppressed in comparison to the top components. Substituting this expression into the first equation gives after some rearrangement

The operator on the left represents the particle energy reduced by its rest energy, which is just the classical energy, so one can recover Pauli's theory upon identifying his 2-spinor with the top components of the Dirac spinor in the non-relativistic approximation. A further approximation gives the Schrödinger equation as the limit of the Pauli theory. Thus, the Schrödinger equation may be seen as the far non-relativistic approximation of the Dirac equation when one may neglect spin and work only at low energies and velocities. This also was a great triumph for the new equation, as it traced the mysterious  that appears in it, and the necessity of a complex wave function, back to the geometry of spacetime through the Dirac algebra. It also highlights why the Schrödinger equation, although superficially in the form of a diffusion equation, actually represents the propagation of waves.

It should be strongly emphasized that this separation of the Dirac spinor into large and small components depends explicitly on a low-energy approximation. The entire Dirac spinor represents an irreducible whole, and the components just neglected here to arrive at the Pauli theory will bring in new phenomena in the relativistic regime – antimatter and the idea of creation and annihilation of particles.

Weyl theory 
In the massless case , the Dirac equation reduces to the Weyl equation, which describes relativistic massless spin- particles.

The theory acquires a second  symmetry: see below.

Physical interpretation

Identification of observables 
The critical physical question in a quantum theory is this: what are the physically observable quantities defined by the theory? According to the postulates of quantum mechanics, such quantities are defined by Hermitian operators that act on the Hilbert space of possible states of a system. The eigenvalues of these operators are then the possible results of measuring the corresponding physical quantity. In the Schrödinger theory, the simplest such object is the overall Hamiltonian, which represents the total energy of the system. To maintain this interpretation on passing to the Dirac theory, the Hamiltonian must be taken to be

where, as always, there is an implied summation over the twice-repeated index . What about the term involving the vector potential? In classical electrodynamics, the energy of a charge moving in an applied potential is

Thus, the Dirac Hamiltonian is fundamentally distinguished from its classical counterpart, and one must take great care to correctly identify what is observable in this theory. Much of the apparently paradoxical behavior implied by the Dirac equation amounts to a misidentification of these observables.

Hole theory 
The negative  solutions to the equation are problematic, for it was assumed that the particle has a positive energy. Mathematically speaking, however, there seems to be no reason for us to reject the negative-energy solutions. Since they exist, they cannot simply be ignored, for once the interaction between the electron and the electromagnetic field is included, any electron placed in a positive-energy eigenstate would decay into negative-energy eigenstates of successively lower energy. Real electrons obviously do not behave in this way, or they would disappear by emitting energy in the form of photons.

To cope with this problem, Dirac introduced the hypothesis, known as hole theory, that the vacuum is the many-body quantum state in which all the negative-energy electron eigenstates are occupied. This description of the vacuum as a "sea" of electrons is called the Dirac sea. Since the Pauli exclusion principle forbids electrons from occupying the same state, any additional electron would be forced to occupy a positive-energy eigenstate, and positive-energy electrons would be forbidden from decaying into negative-energy eigenstates.

If an electron is forbidden from simultaneously occupying positive-energy and negative-energy eigenstates, then the feature known as Zitterbewegung, which arises from the interference of positive-energy and negative-energy states, would have to be considered to be an unphysical prediction of time-dependent Dirac theory.  This conclusion may be inferred from the explanation of hole theory given in the preceding paragraph. Recent results have been published in Nature [R. Gerritsma, G. Kirchmair, F. Zaehringer, E. Solano, R. Blatt, and C. Roos, Nature 463, 68-71 (2010)] in which the Zitterbewegung feature was simulated in a trapped-ion experiment. This experiment impacts the hole interpretation if one infers that the physics-laboratory experiment is not merely a check on the mathematical correctness of a Dirac equation solution but the measurement of a real effect whose detectability in electron physics is still beyond reach.

Dirac further reasoned that if the negative-energy eigenstates are incompletely filled, each unoccupied eigenstate – called a hole – would behave like a positively charged particle. The hole possesses a positive energy because energy is required to create a particle–hole pair from the vacuum. As noted above, Dirac initially thought that the hole might be the proton, but Hermann Weyl pointed out that the hole should behave as if it had the same mass as an electron, whereas the proton is over 1800 times heavier. The hole was eventually identified as the positron, experimentally discovered by Carl Anderson in 1932.

It is not entirely satisfactory to describe the "vacuum" using an infinite sea of negative-energy electrons. The infinitely negative contributions from the sea of negative-energy electrons have to be canceled by an infinite positive "bare" energy and the contribution to the charge density and current coming from the sea of negative-energy electrons is exactly canceled by an infinite positive "jellium" background so that the net electric charge density of the vacuum is zero. In quantum field theory, a Bogoliubov transformation on the creation and annihilation operators (turning an occupied negative-energy electron state into an unoccupied positive energy positron state and an unoccupied negative-energy electron state into an occupied positive energy positron state) allows us to bypass the Dirac sea formalism even though, formally, it is equivalent to it.

In certain applications of condensed matter physics, however, the underlying concepts of "hole theory" are valid. The sea of conduction electrons in an electrical conductor, called a Fermi sea, contains electrons with energies up to the chemical potential of the system. An unfilled state in the Fermi sea behaves like a positively charged electron, though it is referred to as a "hole" rather than a "positron". The negative charge of the Fermi sea is balanced by the positively charged ionic lattice of the material.

In quantum field theory 

In quantum field theories such as quantum electrodynamics, the Dirac field is subject to a process of second quantization, which resolves some of the paradoxical features of the equation.

Further discussion of Lorentz covariance of the Dirac equation
The Dirac equation is Lorentz covariant. Articulating this helps illuminate not only the Dirac equation, but also the Majorana spinor and Elko spinor, which although closely related, have subtle and important differences.

Understanding Lorentz covariance is simplified by keeping in mind the geometric character of the process. Let  be a single, fixed point in the spacetime manifold. Its location can be expressed in multiple coordinate systems.
One can imagine  as having a fiber of different coordinate frames above it. In geometric terms, one says that spacetime can be characterized as a fiber bundle, and specifically, the frame bundle. A choice of coordinate frame is a (local) section through that bundle.

Coupled to the frame bundle is a second bundle, the spinor bundle. A section through the spinor bundle is just the particle field (the Dirac spinor, in the present case).  Different points in the spinor fiber correspond to the same physical object (the fermion) but expressed in different Lorentz frames. Clearly, the frame bundle and the spinor bundle must be tied together in a consistent fashion to get consistent results; formally, one says that the spinor bundle is the associated bundle; it is associated to a principal bundle, which in the present case is the frame bundle. Differences between points on the fiber correspond to the symmetries of the system. The spinor bundle has two distinct generators of its symmetries: the total angular momentum and the intrinsic angular momentum. Both correspond to Lorentz transformations, but in different ways.

The presentation here follows that of Itzykson and Zuber. It is very nearly identical to that of Bjorken and Drell. A similar derivation in a general relativistic setting can be found in Weinberg. Here we fix our spacetime to be flat, that is, our spacetime is Minkowski space.

Under a Lorentz transformation  the Dirac spinor to transform as

This matrix can be interpreted as the intrinsic angular momentum of the Dirac field. That it deserves this interpretation arises by contrasting it to the generator  of Lorentz transformations, having the form

This can be interpreted as the total angular momentum. It acts on the spinor field as

The geometrical interpretation of the above is that the frame field is affine, having no preferred origin.

Let  be a Lorentz transformation.  The Dirac equation is

If the Dirac equation is to be covariant, then it should have exactly the same form in all Lorentz frames:

The two spinors  and  should both describe the same physical field, and so should be related by a transformation that does not change any physical observables (charge, current, mass, etc.) The transformation should encode only the change of coordinate frame. It can be shown that such a transformation is a 4×4 unitary matrix. Thus, one may presume that the relation between the two frames can be written as

Inserting this into the transformed equation, the result is

The coordinates related by Lorentz transformation satisfy: 

The original Dirac equation is then regained if

 
where  is the metric tensor :  and is symmetric while  is antisymmetric.  After plugging and chugging, one obtains

To obtain the affine relabelling, write

After properly antisymmetrizing, one obtains the generator of symmetries  given earlier.  Thus, both  and  can be said to be the "generators of Lorentz transformations", but with a subtle distinction: the first corresponds to a relabelling of points on the affine frame bundle, which forces a translation along the fiber of the spinor on the spin bundle, while the second corresponds to translations along the fiber of the spin bundle (taken as a movement  along the frame bundle, as well as a movement  along the fiber of the spin bundle.) Weinberg provides additional arguments for the physical interpretation of these as total and intrinsic angular momentum.

Other formulations 
The Dirac equation can be formulated in a number of other ways.

Curved spacetime 

This article has developed the Dirac equation in flat spacetime according to special relativity. It is possible to formulate the Dirac equation in curved spacetime.

The algebra of physical space 

This article developed the Dirac equation using four vectors and Schrödinger operators. The Dirac equation in the algebra of physical space uses a Clifford algebra over the real numbers, a type of geometric algebra.

U(1) symmetry 
Natural units are used in this section. The coupling constant is labelled by convention with : this parameter can also be viewed as modelling the electron charge.

Vector symmetry 
The Dirac equation and action admits a  symmetry where the fields  transform as

This is a global symmetry, known as the  vector symmetry (as opposed to the  axial symmetry: see below). By Noether's theorem there is a corresponding conserved current: this has been mentioned previously as

Gauging the symmetry 

The fix proceeds as in scalar electrodynamics: the partial derivative is promoted to a covariant derivative 

The covariant derivative depends on the field being acted on. The newly introduced  is the 4-vector potential from electrodynamics, but also can be viewed as a  gauge field, or a  connection.

but can also be derived by asking that covariant derivatives transform under a gauge transformation as

We then obtain a gauge-invariant Dirac action by promoting the partial derivative to a covariant one:

The final step needed to write down a gauge-invariant Lagrangian is to add a Maxwell Lagrangian term,

Putting these together gives

Expanding out the covariant derivative allows the action to be written in a second useful form:

Axial symmetry 

This is seen most easily by writing the four-component Dirac fermion  as a pair of two-component vector fields,

and adopting the chiral representation for the gamma matrices, so that  may be written

where  has components  and  has components .

The Dirac action then takes the form

That is, it decouples into a theory of two Weyl spinors or Weyl fermions.

The earlier vector symmetry is still present, where  and  rotate identically. This form of the action makes the second inequivalent  symmetry manifest:

This can also be expressed at the level of the Dirac fermion as 

where  is the exponential map for matrices.

This isn't the only  symmetry possible, but it is conventional. Any 'linear combination' of the vector and axial symmetries is also a  symmetry.

Classically, the axial symmetry admits a well-formulated gauge theory. But at the quantum level, there is an anomaly, that is, an obstruction to gauging.

Extension to color symmetry 

We can extend this discussion from an abelian  symmetry to a general non-abelian symmetry under a gauge group , the group of color symmetries for a theory.

Promoting the theory to a gauge theory, informally  acquires a part transforming like , and these are labelled by color indices, conventionally Latin indices . The 'spinor' labels only how the field transforms under spacetime transformations. 

Formally,  is valued in a tensor product, that is, it is a function 

Gauging proceeds similarly to the abelian  case, with a few differences. Under a gauge transformation  the spinor fields transform as

The matrix-valued gauge field  or  connection transforms as

and the covariant derivatives defined 

transform as 

Writing down a gauge-invariant action proceeds exactly as with the  case, replacing the Maxwell Lagrangian with the Yang–Mills Lagrangian

where the Yang–Mills field strength or curvature is defined here as

The action is then

Physical applications 
For physical applications, the case  describes the quark sector of the Standard model which models strong interactions. Quarks are modelled as Dirac spinors; the gauge field is the gluon field. The case  describes part of the electroweak sector of the Standard model. Leptons such as electrons and neutrinos are the Dirac spinors; the gauge field is the  gauge boson.

Generalisations 
Formally, the Dirac field is a function 

Then  transforms under a gauge transformation  as

and the covariant derivative is defined

This theory can be generalised to curved spacetime, but there are subtleties which arise in gauge theory on a general spacetime (or more generally still, a manifold) which, on flat spacetime, can be ignored.

See also

Articles on the Dirac equation 
 Dirac field
 Dirac spinor
 Gordon decomposition
 Klein paradox
 Nonlinear Dirac equation

Other equations 
 Breit equation
 Dirac–Kähler equation
 Klein–Gordon equation
 Rarita–Schwinger equation
 Two-body Dirac equations
 Weyl equation
 Majorana equation

Other topics 
 Fermionic field
 Feynman checkerboard
 Foldy–Wouthuysen transformation
 Quantum electrodynamics
 Quantum chromodynamics

References

Citations

Selected papers

Textbooks

External links 

 The Dirac Equation at MathPages
 The Nature of the Dirac Equation, its solutions, and Spin
  Dirac equation for a spin  particle
 Pedagogic Aids to Quantum Field Theory click on Chap. 4 for a step-by-small-step introduction to the Dirac equation, spinors, and relativistic spin/helicity operators.
 BBC Documentary Atom 3 The Illusion of Reality

 
1928 introductions
Fermions
Partial differential equations
Equation
Quantum field theory
Spinors